Bäckängsgymnasiet is a gymnasium in Borås, Sweden that offers university preparatory programs in natural and social sciences, art and humanities. The school was founded in 1901 as "Högre allmänna läroverket i Borås", which can be translated as "the higher education institute of Borås".

Approximately 1000 students are enrolled in Bäckängsgymnasiet's programs each year.

Famous alumni include: former Prime Minister Ingvar Carlsson, actor Helge Skoog and artist and filmmaker Pål Hollender.

References

See also
Borås

Borås
Gymnasiums (school) in Sweden
Buildings and structures in Västra Götaland County
Educational institutions established in 1901
1901 establishments in Sweden